Kaveri, also known as Kalyani, is an Indian actress and film producer who mostly appeared in Malayalam, Telugu, Tamil and Kannada language films. She had a critically acclaimed performance in the 2002 Telugu film Avunu Valliddaru Ista Paddaru!, that fetched her the Nandi Award for Best Actress.

Early life
Kaveri was born into a Malayali family settled in Kavumbhagom, Thiruvalla, Kerala. Her father, Muralidharan, worked at Kerala State Road Transport Corporation.

Career

She started her film career as a child artist in Malayalam films, appeared in several Malayalam, Tamil, Telugu and Kannada language films. After playing lead and supporting roles in Malayalam, Tamil films, she enacted female lead roles in several Malayalam, Tamil, Kannada, and Telugu language films.

She has won the Kerala state television award for best actress in 2002 for Anna and Nandi Award for Best Actress for her performance in Avunu Valliddaru Ista Paddaru (2002). She is perhaps best known for her appearances and critically acclaimed performances in films such as Vasanthiyum Lakshmiyum Pinne Njaanum, Samudhiram, Avunu Valliddaru Ista Paddaru, Kabaddi Kabaddi and Kasi.

Personal life 
She was married to Surya Kiran later they separated.

Awards

Kerala State Television Awards
 2002-Kerala State Television Award for Best Actress - Annaa
Nandi Awards
 2002-Nandi Award for Best Actress - Avunu Valliddaru Ista Paddaru
SICA Awards
 2002- SICA Awards for Best Actress - Avunu Valliddaru Ista Paddaru

Filmography

TV career

References

External links 
 
 Kaveri at MSI

Indian film actresses
21st-century Indian actresses
Living people
Actresses from Kerala
Actresses in Tamil cinema
Actresses in Telugu cinema
Actresses in Malayalam cinema
Indian women film producers
Malayalam film producers
Nandi Award winners
Indian television actresses
Actresses in Kannada cinema
People from Pathanamthitta district
20th-century Indian actresses
Child actresses in Malayalam cinema
Film producers from Kerala
Kerala State Television Award winners
Indian child actresses
Businesswomen from Kerala
Actresses in Malayalam television
Actresses in Tamil television
Year of birth missing (living people)